Southern Glazer's Wine and Spirits of America is the largest wine and spirits distributor in the United States with operations in 44 states and Washington, D.C. Southern's portfolio is 45% wine and 55% spirits. It was the 11th largest private company in the United States in 2021.

History 
Southern Wine and Spirits was founded in 1968 in Florida by Jay W. Weiss, Harvey R Chaplin, and Howard Preuss in their headquarters in Miramar. The company expanded from Florida to California in 1969. In 1977, Howard Preuss died due to cancer. His widow, Celia Preuss, sold her part of the company to the remaining owners. Southern was one of the first companies to have statewide distribution in California, which is the company's largest market; prior to Southern's presence, California had dozens of small distributors.

The company spread to Nevada in 1976, Arizona in 1992, South Carolina in 1993, Pennsylvania in 1995, Hawaii in 1996, Kentucky in 1998, New Mexico in 2000, Colorado in 2001, Illinois in 2002, New York in 2004, Maine, Mississippi, New Hampshire, North Carolina, Vermont, Virginia and West Virginia in 2005. In 2006, the company began operations in Alabama and entered Delaware in 2008. In July 2008, Southern Wine and Spirits merged with the Odom Corporation which added Oregon, Washington, Idaho, Montana, Wyoming and Alaska to its distribution areas. Southern entered the Indiana market in 2010.

Southern now has a presence in Maryland and the District of Columbia through a joint venture with F.P. Winner Wine & Spirits, as well as a joint venture operation in Minnesota with J.J. Taylor Distributing Company. The company holds operating licenses and permits in Indiana, Nebraska, and Texas.

In January 2016, the company merged with Glazer's, changing the name to Southern Glazer's Wine and Spirits, forming the biggest wine and spirits distributor in the country.

People 
Harvey R. Chaplin is the chairman.

His son, Wayne E. Chaplin, serves as the President and CEO.

Mel Dick is the Senior Vice President of Southern Wine & Spirits of America and President of the company's Wine Division. In 2001, Mel Dick was awarded the Legion of Honor medal by the President of France, Jacques Chirac, for his efforts to promote french wine. He was first hired at Southern Wine and Spirits in 1969 as General Sales Manager-Wine to develop the wine operations of the company, and was later promoted to Senior Vice President in 1991.

Brad Vassar serves as Executive Vice President and C.O.O.

Products 
Southern Glazer's represents approximately 1,500 wine, spirit, beer, and beverage suppliers from around the world, and markets, promotes, merchandises, and distributes over 7,000 brands. The company employs more than 20,000 people. During a working week, the sales, delivery, and support staff of Southern Glazer's collectively calls on or services over 250,000 different chains and independent retail and restaurant customers across the country.

In May 2018, Southern Wine & Spirits reached a deal with Aphria for its new subsidiary Great North Distributors to exclusively distribute Aphria's recreational cannabis products in Canada when its recreational use becomes legal in the country.

References

External links 
Official website

Companies based in Miami
Business services companies established in 1968
1968 establishments in Florida
Wholesalers of the United States